Rob "Blazer" Blasdell (born May 15, 1970) is a lacrosse goaltender who plays for the Edmonton Rush in the National Lacrosse League.

Professional career
Blasdell began his career with the Ontario Raiders in 1998, moving with them to Toronto the next year. After being left unprotected by the Rock, Blasdell was selected by the expansion Albany Attack in the 1999 expansion draft. Blasdell played four seasons in Albany, and was named NLL Goaltender of the Year in 2002 when he led the Attack to the NLL finals.

The Attack moved to San Jose before the 2004 season and Blasdell played in all 16 games that season, but after a blockbuster trade brought goaltender Anthony Cosmo to San Jose in the summer of 2004, Blasdell served as a backup for Cosmo for the 2005 season. He was then dealt to the Arizona Sting, where he earned the starting role and returned to the championship game in 2007.

After the cancellation and subsequent reinstatement of the 2008 season, the Arizona Sting and Boston Blazers announced that they would not be playing in 2008. A dispersal draft was held, and Blasdell was selected third overall by the Philadelphia Wings.  When the Arizona Sting ceased operations prior to the 2009 NLL season, another dispersal draft was held, and Blasdell was again selected by the Philadelphia Wings.

Statistics

NLL

Awards

References

1970 births
Living people
Lacrosse goaltenders
Arizona Sting players
Canadian expatriate lacrosse people in the United States
Canadian lacrosse players
Edmonton Rush players
Lacrosse people from Ontario
National Lacrosse League All-Stars
National Lacrosse League major award winners
Sportspeople from Brantford
Philadelphia Wings players
San Jose Stealth players
Toronto Rock players